Prostanthera serpyllifolia, commonly known as small-leaved mint-bush, is a species of flowering plant in the family Lamiaceae and is endemic to southern Australia. It is a small shrub with small egg-shaped leaves and bright pink to red or metallic bluish-green flowers.

Description
Flowering occurs in April or from June to December.

Taxonomy
Small-leaved mint-bush was first formally described in 1810 by botanist Robert Brown, who gave it the name Cryphia serpyllifolia, and published the description in Prodromus Florae Novae Hollandiae et Insulae Van Diemen, based on plant material collected from the southern Eyre Peninsula in South Australia. In 1895 John Isaac Briquet changed the name to Prostanthera serpyllifolia.

In 1984, Barry Conn described two subspecies of P. serpyllifolia in the Journal of the Adelaide Botanic Gardens and the names are accepted by the Australian Plant Census:
 Prostanthera serpyllifolia subsp. microphylla (R.Br.)
 Prostanthera serpyllifolia (R.Br.)

Distribution and habitat
Prostanthera serpyllifolia occurs in New South Wales, Victoria, South Australia and Western Australia where it often grows in mallee communities, often on limestone or calcrete. Subspecies microphylla occurs in New South Wales where it is found west from near West Wyalong. The same subspecies grows in the far north-west of Victoria, in the south east of South Australia, and along the southern part of Western Australia as far west as the southern Avon Wheatbelt. Subspecies serpyllifolia occurs on the Yorke and Eyre Peninsulas and there is a single record from the southwest of Western Australia.

References

serpyllifolia
Flora of New South Wales
Flora of South Australia
Flora of Victoria (Australia)
Flora of Western Australia
Lamiales of Australia
Plants described in 1810
Taxa named by Robert Brown (botanist, born 1773)